Women in Malta refers to, amongst others, the social status of women in the Maltese society in different context of Maltese history, past and present.

Education 
The Roman Catholic Church in Malta remained stagnant about the role of women in society, at least until the late 20th century, by holding the view that females were to get married and become housewives throughout their lives.

Schooling of girls in Malta indicates: “...evidence of remarkable commitment to the full development of girls in a global society.”

Politics and suffrage 

Fifteen general elections have been contested since the granting of universal suffrage in Malta in 1947. Only 73 women have contested in these elections. The number of men, on the other hand, has exceeded 1000.  The number of women contesting general elections has, however, increased over the years. In fact, the 1998 elections saw 24 women candidates participating, the highest number to date, with six of these getting elected, registering a 25 percent success rate.

The smallest number of female candidates was in 1947, numbering only two. However, the result showed a 50 percent success rate, since Agatha Barbara was elected. The election of 1955 saw the lowest percentage of women candidates being elected with a 14.3 percent success rate, when only one candidate out of seven was elected. Following this, the success rate rose slowly until, in the 1976 election, there was a 42.3 percent success rate for women candidates. At that time, three out of seven contestants were returned. These were two Labour candidates Agatha Barbara and Evelyn Bonaci, while Anne Agius Ferrante from the PN obtained a seat following a by-election.

However, the success rates of the first and third elections won by female candidates have never been matched up till now (in 1947 it reached 50 percent while in 1951 it was 57.1 percent). The rate slowly rose to 42.9 percent in 1976, but this momentum was lost and success fell to 20 percent in 1981. It rose to just 28.6 percent in 2003. The 2003 election gave the same results as that of 1998, with six women parliamentarians, three each for the two main political parties.

Abduction and marriage laws

In 2015, Malta was criticized by Equality Now, for a law which, in certain circumstances, can extinguish the punishment for a man who abducts a woman, if following the abduction, the man and woman get married. (Article 199 and Article 200 of the Criminal Code of Malta) The article was ultimately abolished by Act XIII of 2018, Article 24.

Further reading
The library of the National Commission for the Promotion of Equality (NCPE) in Malta
S. O'Reilly Mizzi. "The Changing Status of Women in Malta" Journal of the Faculty of Arts 6:4 (1977) pp.253-263

See also 
 Malta Girl Guides Association

References

External links 

Malta
Association of International Women in Malta
National Council of Women of Malta
Malta Association of Women in Business
Women the labour market in Malta

 
Maltese women